Stephen Otter  (born 24 May 1962) is a former chief constable of Devon and Cornwall Police, a post he held from joining the force in January 2007 until his departure in March 2012. He was succeeded by Shaun Sawyer.

Otter was previously the deputy chief constable at Avon & Somerset Constabulary, and has also served during his career with Thames Valley Police, the Metropolitan Police and the Royal Hong Kong Police Force. He was the Association of Chief Police Officers' ACPO lead on race and diversity during his time at Devon and Cornwall Police.

Otter was awarded the Queen's Police Medal in the New Year Honours list of 2008.

He now works at Her Majesty's Inspectorate of Constabulary, overseeing the National Team. As of 2015, Otter was paid a salary of between £190,000 and £194,999 by the department, making him one of the 328 most highly paid people in the British public sector at that time.

Honours
 He was awarded the Queen's Police Medal (QPM) in the 2008 New Years Honours List.

References

External links
Devon & Cornwall Police Website

Chief Constables of Devon and Cornwall Police
English recipients of the Queen's Police Medal
Devon and Cornwall Police recipients of the Queen's Police Medal
Living people
Date of birth missing (living people)
1962 births